"Daydream Believer" is a song written by John Stewart and originally recorded by the Monkees.

Daydream Believer or Daydream Believers may also refer to:

 Daydream Believer (film), a 2001 American film directed by Debra Eisenstadt
 Daydream Believer and Other Hits, a 1998 compilation album by the Monkees
 Daydream Believers: The Monkees' Story, a 2000 made-for-television biographical film about the Monkees
 "Daydream Believer", the 20th episode of season 16 of Law & Order: Special Victims Unit